This is a list of the top-selling singles in New Zealand for 2016 from the Official New Zealand Music Chart's end-of-year chart, compiled by Recorded Music NZ. Canadian singer-songwriter Justin Bieber appeared in five songs each in the chart and Barbadian singer Rihanna four, whether it was their own single or as a featured artist respectively. The chart was topped by Drake featuring Wizkid & Kyla's song "One Dance". The only song by a New Zealand artist or group to chart was the Kings single, "Don't Worry Bout It".

Chart 
Key
 – Song of New Zealand origin

Top 20 singles of 2016 by New Zealand artists

Notes

References 

 Top Selling NZ Singles of 2016 - Recorded Music NZ

External links 
 The Official NZ Music Chart - singles

2016 in New Zealand music
2016 record charts
Singles 2016